Jingbo Wang is an Australian quantum physicist working in the area of quantum simulation, quantum algorithms, and quantum information science.

Education
Wang received her PhD from the Department of Physics and Mathematical Physics, Adelaide University, Australia.

Academic career
Wang is currently a Professor and Head of the Physics Department at the University of Western Australia. She directs the QUISA (Quantum Information, Simulation and Algorithms) Research Centre, which aims to foster collaboration and entrepreneurship, bringing together academic staff, research students, government and industrial partners to develop innovative quantum solutions to tackle otherwise intractable problems and complex phenomena. Professor Wang is also the Chair of Australian Institute of Physics (WA Branch).

Her team carried out research involving especially single and multi-particle quantum walks, demonstrating their power in analyzing complex networks, in identifying topological similarities in complex systems, in image processing and machine learning, and in optimizing combinatorial problems. They have also obtained highly efficient quantum circuits to implement quantum algorithms of practical importance.

Honours and recognition 
 Vice-Chancellor’s Award for Research Mentorship, The University of Western Australia (2022)
 Fellow, Australian Institute of Physics (2020)
 WA Dennis Moore Award for achievements in quantum computing research, Australian Computer Society (2018)

Books 
 Josh Izaac and Jingbo Wang, Computational Quantum Mechanics, Springer (2018)
 Kia Manouchehri and Jingbo Wang, Physical Implementation of Quantum Walks, Springer (2014)

References

External links 

University of Western Australia, profile, Professor Jingbo Wang

Australian scientists
University of Adelaide alumni
Academic staff of the University of Western Australia
Year of birth missing (living people)
Living people